Bannu Medical College (BMC) is a public medical institute located in Bannu, Khyber Pakhtunkhwa, Pakistan. It is one of several medical colleges affiliated with the Khyber Medical University and enrolls 100 students each year. BMC is recognized by the Pakistan Medical and Dental Council and is listed in the World Directory of Medical Colleges.

History
BMC was established in August 2006 by former Khyber Pakhtunkhwa Chief Minister Akram Khan Durrani and opened that December. In 2009, a new campus in Bannu Township was approved and formal work started in 2013. Though the 600 kanal campus was intended to be completed by 2016, there were delays due to shortage of funds, with the construction estimated to cost Rs627 million. The temporary location for the college was in Bannu City in the Government High School No. 3 building. Because the Bannu City campus did not have residence halls, students had to find their own accommodation. Construction finished and the permanent campus in Bannu Township was opened in March 2021.

Programs

Basic Sciences
 Anatomy
 Biochemistry
 Dentistry
 Forensic Medicine
 Pathology
 Pharmacology
 Psychiatry
 Community Medicine

Clinical sciences
 General Medicine
 Paediatrics
 Pulmonology
 Cardiology
 Psychiatry
 General Surgery
 Orthopaedic Surgery
 Paediatric Surgery
 Neurosurgery
 Radiology
 Gynaecology
 Ears, Nose, Throat (ENT)
 Ophthalmology
 Dentistry

The 600-bed Khalifa Gul Nawaz Memorial Hospital, 244-bed District Headquarters (DHQ) Hospital, and the 130-bed Women and Children's Hospital are associated with the college. DHQ is recognized by the Pakistan Nursing Council.

Student life
Student groups annually arrange college funfairs and partake in festivities such as Urdu Day, Pashto Day, English Day, and Sports Day. Medical activities and photography seminars are also available. The college publishes Baraan, previously Taryaaq, a magazine that is released annually.

References

Khyber Medical University
Medical colleges in Khyber Pakhtunkhwa
2006 establishments in Pakistan
Educational institutions established in 2006
Public universities and colleges in Khyber Pakhtunkhwa